Foreign relations exist between Austria and Montenegro. Austria recognized Montenegro on 12 June 2006. Both countries established diplomatic relations on 12 July 2006. Austria has an embassy in Podgorica and an honorary consulate in Budva. Montenegro has an embassy in Vienna.
Also Austria is an EU member and Montenegro is an EU candidate.

See also 
 Foreign relations of Austria
 Foreign relations of Montenegro
 1995 enlargement of the European Union 
 Accession of Montenegro to the European Union
 Austria–Yugoslavia relations

External links 
 Austrian Foreign Ministry: list of bilateral treaties with Montenegro (in German only) 

 

 
Montenegro
Austria